Rev. Frederick Lewis Weis, Th.D. (August 22, 1895 – April 11, 1966) was an American historian and the writer of a number of well-known genealogical books.

Born in Cranston, Rhode Island to John Peter Carl Weis and his wife Georgina Lewis, both natives of Massachusetts, Frederick was the second child of four children.

In April 1913, he entered the United States Naval Academy, graduating in March 1917. He served on the Wisconsin and North Dakota and retired prematurely due to illness. He was active in various genealogical organizations and wrote numerous books and articles. He is today still remembered as a foundational writer in many areas of genealogical research.

He was elected a Fellow of the American Society of Genealogists in 1951.

He died at Brattleboro, Vermont.

Selected works
Magna Charta Sureties, 1215, Baltimore, 1964
Ancestral Roots of Sixty Colonists Who Came to New England between 1623 and 1650, 1951
Colonial Clergy of Maryland Delaware and Georgia
Colonial Clergy of the Middle Colonies: New York New Jersey and Pennsylvania 1628 1776
Colonial Clergy of Virginia, North Carolina and South Carolina, 1995
The Colby Family in Early America, Caledonia, The Colonial Press, 1970
Eight lines of descent of John Prescott, founder of Lancaster, Massachusetts, 1645, from Alfred the Great, King of England, 871-901

References

External links
 The journals of Frederick Lewis Weis are in the Harvard Divinity School Library at Harvard Divinity School in Cambridge, Massachusetts.

American genealogists
1895 births
1967 deaths
United States Naval Academy alumni
People from Cranston, Rhode Island
20th-century American historians
American male non-fiction writers
Fellows of the American Society of Genealogists
20th-century American male writers
Historians from Rhode Island